Sia Michel (born May 17, 1967, in Erie, Pennsylvania) is the deputy culture editor of The New York Times. Before her promotion to that position in 2018, she was the editor of Arts & Leisure and pop music editor for the "Times", which she had joined in 2007. Michel obtained her degree from the University of Pennsylvania.

Michel became editor-in-chief of Spin in February 2002 after working at the magazine for five years. She held this position until February 2006 when the magazine was bought out by new owners. She was the first woman to edit a large-circulation American rock magazine. She has won several awards for reporting and feature writing. This includes a 1999 ASCAP Deems Taylor Award for her reporting on the death of hip-hop icon The Notorious B.I.G.

Career
Michel began her career as a reporter and music editor with SF Weekly.

References

External links
 Drake, Rossiter. "So What Do You Do, Sia Michel?" mediabistro.com, 20 May 2003
 Sia Michel Named Editor of Spin

1967 births
Living people
American music critics
American women music critics
American women journalists
American magazine editors
The New York Times editors
Writers from Erie, Pennsylvania
20th-century American women writers
University of Pennsylvania Law School alumni
Women writers about music
Journalists from Pennsylvania
20th-century American journalists
Women magazine editors
21st-century American women